Florence Ripley Mastin (March 18, 1886 - February 23, 1968 was an American poet and teacher.

Life
Florence Josephine Mastin was born March 18, 1886, in Wayne Pennsylvania, grew up in Piermont, New York, and earned a BA at Barnard College. After graduating from Barnard College, she taught at Erasmus Hall High School. In her 20s she changed her middle name from Josephine to Ripley.

Florence died on February 23, 1968, in New York at the age of 81.

Work and Awards
Florence's poem "Freedom's Dream" won the Freedom Foundation Medal in 1959 and in 1960 was made New York State's official poem. More than 90 of her poems were published in The New York Times editorial page.

References

1886 births
1968 deaths
20th-century American poets